Heia Station is located at Heia in Rakkestad, Norway on the Eastern Østfold Line. The station is served by the Oslo Commuter Rail line R22 from Oslo S during rush hour. Heia Station was opened in 1896.

Railway stations in Østfold
Railway stations on the Østfold Line
Railway stations opened in 1896
1896 establishments in Norway
Rakkestad